Dougherty Comprehensive High School is a four-year secondary school located in Albany, Georgia, United States. It is part of the Dougherty County School System, along with, Monroe Comprehensive High School, and Westover Comprehensive High School.  It was founded in 1963.

DCHS enrolls about 869 students. The student body is 94% African-American, 4% Caucasian, and 2% of other races.

DCHS is a Title I school, with about 86% economically disadvantaged students and about 7% with disabilities.

Dougherty High is the first and only high school in the Dougherty County School System to be under the charter school system to implement the International Baccalaureate Program, starting in the 2008-2009 school year.
    
The school colors are maroon, silver and white, and its mascot is the Trojan.

Early history
Dougherty High School was built in an effort to accommodate East Albany and the growing number of students from the two military bases located nearby. One was a SAC Air Force base, Turner AFB which later became Naval Air Station Albany and the other was a Marine base, Marine Corps Supply Center Albany. The school opened its first year in September, 1963 (without a senior class). The first graduating class was in 1965. "Onward, upward we shall strive, senior class of 65" was the class motto.

This was before the comprehensive approach to education was adopted. Each grade was divided into three levels of achievement: above average, average and below average.

Dougherty High was an excellent school with above average teachers, most of whom had master's degrees and were tops in their fields. The graduation rate was 98%, which was greater than the state average of the period.

There was a broad spectrum of classes, including math, English, Physical Science, Social Science, Sociology and Psychology, Biology, Industrial Arts and Home Economics, mechanical drawing and shop, music and Language Arts and business administration. Sports includes track, football, basketball, tennis, softball, soccer, cross country, wrestling, golf and cheerleading. Dougherty High has many clubs and organizations, such as Band, Civitans and Civinetts, Key Club, Anchor Club, Interact, Glee Club, Spanish Club, Future Homemakers of America, Future Business Leaders of America, FTA, Audio Visual and Allied Medical Student Council and Beta Club, Science Club, SkillsUSA and the Thespians.
 
The first black students to attend Dougherty High were Brenda Barlow and Shirley Carruthers, both 1966 seniors. The closing of the Air Force base and later the Navy base in the late 1960s provided an opportunity for the Douherty County School systems to move a large portion of Monroe High school's largely black student population to the relatively newer Dougherty High School. The three-tier class system could no longer be supported, so the Dougherty County School system changed to the comprehensive method of class dispersal. In other words, all the students of a particular grade were taught the same thing on the same level. Hence Dougherty High School became Dougherty Comprehensive High School.

Athletics

Football
The football team won the GHSA Class AAA State Championship in 1998 & 2023.

Basketball
Dougherty won the  boys' GHSA State Basketball Championships in 1997 (AAA),  2001 & 2023 (AAAA).

Extracurricular organizations
FCCLA - This group's goal is to promote growth and leadership development through family and consumer sciences education, focusing on the multiple roles of family member, wage earner, and community leader.  Its motto is "Toward New Horizons."
JGG - Jobs for Georgia's Graduates is a school-to-work transition program for seniors. It prepares students for the world of work and maintains higher education.
Fellowship of Christian Athletes - This group provides Christian fellowship opportunities. FCA members meet on Tuesday mornings for prayer and devotionals, and meet periodically at the flagpole for prayer.
Alpha Mentee -  This organization has been at Dougherty High since 2000. It is designed to build character education and to familiarize high school students with basic life skills, such as developing self-discipline, having high self-esteem, and promoting positive values. It involves its members in community service projects such as local nursing home visits and seasonal food drives.  Mentees take part in college visitations. The organization is networked and affiliated under Alpha Phi Alpha fraternity.
Future Business Leaders of America - Dougherty High's FBLA is part of Georgia FBLA, a nonprofit student organization committed to preparing today's students for success in business leadership. With over 75 members, it is the premiere organization for student leaders. Its mission is to bring business and education together in a positive working relationship through innovative leadership and career development programs. FBLA's motto is "Service, Education, and Progress."
MCJROTC  - This provides leadership training for students.

Phantom Trojan Marching Band

The Phantom Trojan Marching Band (PTMBband has participated in marching band festivals and competitions in Georgia, Florida, and Alabama. It has won in both traditional and corps-style competitions. The drumline, known as Phantom Phunq, were crowned grand champions three consecutive years (2001-2003) at the annual Battle of the Drumline in Columbus, Georgia.

Members of this band appeared in the movie Drumline.

Along with marching band, students participate in other ensembles such as symphonic band, concert band, jazz band, percussion ensemble, and other musical activities.

Chorale
DCHS chorale has won local and national awards and achievements and received praise and acknowledgment from the media. They received a Grammy Signature Award, and have won first place and overall winner awards of 15 national music festival competitions throughout the United States.

They performed for President Jimmy Carter in January 2005 at the National Annual Black Caucus Convention, in Washington, D.C. (for five years straight dating back to September 2003). They have performed with gospel artists Richard Smallwood and Vickie Winans, with classical composers James Mulholland and Moses Hogan, and with the Southeastern Symphony Orchestra.

The DCHS Chorale also released a record, ONE WORLD, in 2004, a compilation of choral music which includes a cappella motets, anthems, spirituals, inspirations, and gospel selections.

The chorale serves through public performances and charitable contributions throughout their community and country. They have presented benefit concerts for homeless shelters and disaster relief.

Events
Sponsored by the DCHS Renaissance Club, DCHS Honors Day is a day for recognizing students for their academic accomplishments, college acceptances, scholarships, and positive character traits.  In the past, this ceremony was held in each of the four nine-week periods of the school year. This tradition ended in December 2007; Honors Day now occurs at the end of the fall semester, and in May.
DCHS Pageant is a female pageant for Miss Dougherty High held every spring. Candidates must be sophomores or juniors. Each candidate represents her extracurricular organization. The winner is named as Miss DCHS for the next school year term.
DCHS Gentillion is a male pageant held in October or November. Each candidate represents his extracurricular organization. Unlike the DCHS pageant, sophomores, juniors, and seniors are allowed to participate as candidates for the contest. The winner is named as Mr. DCHS for the school year.
Georgia High School Graduation Test Stop and Drop Rally is a new tradition to Dougherty High since the 2006-2007 school term. This is a pep rally held in March a few days before the juniors' graduation test. Its main purpose is to increase self-esteem and provide guidance and support for test takers.
DCHS Senior Week is a reward for seniors in honor of their hard work and dedication throughout their high school career. It is usually held in late April or early May. Seniors express themselves by wearing themed attire every day in the week, for example, nerd day, spirit day, and celebrity day. After school hours, seniors gather for social activities such as bowling and movies.
Homecoming - Every day of the week a special tradition is displayed throughout the school. On Friday the traditional homecoming football game is held. During this, homecoming court is introduced before the game or at halftime. The queen and king are announced, based on the vote of the student body. The homecoming dance occurs the day afterward.

School Renovations
Phase I consisted of the addition of the fine arts hall. This hall features two art rooms (2D and 3D), band room, orchestra room, choral room, backstage, and dance studio. Other additions and renovations include the new gallery area in front of the auditorium, black box theatre, renovated auditorium, special education classrooms and health classrooms.

Phase II The work consists of constructing a new central plant, adding to the office and media center, adding a new drafting lab and mechanical spaces to the annex building, converting the breezeway to interior space, and enclosing the space between the main building and the annex building. The existing classrooms and support spaces in the main building will be renovated and modified to include new finishes (floor coverings, ceilings, interior wall finishes/systems, skylights), new mechanical/HVAC, electrical, plumbing, and fire sprinkler systems. The existing bituminous roof will be removed and replaced. The teachers' parking lot on the east wing of the building and service entrance behind the building will be paved. Other renovations and modifications include reconstructing and modernizing the gym, finishing the renovation of the auditorium, converting the auto mechanics garage to a shooting range for MCJROTC, and converting the construction garage to a health occupations lab. Construction began in September 2013, and was expected to be complete in the spring of 2015.

Notable alumni

 Stanley Floyd - champion track and field sprinter, University of Houston
 Lionel James - former NFL player, running back for the San Diego Chargers, member of the 1978-1980 Dougherty High School Trojans football team
 Alexander Johnson - former NBA player, player for the Miami Heat
 Ray Knight - former MLB player (Cincinnati Reds, Houston Astros, New York Mets, Baltimore Orioles, Detroit Tigers) and former manager of the Cincinnati Reds, DHS 1970 graduate.
 Gene Martin - former pinch hitter and left fielder Washington Senators and Nippon Professional Baseball League
 Michael Reid - former NFL linebacker for the Atlanta Falcons, member of the 1980-1982 Dougherty High School Trojans football team
 Daryl Smith - former NFL linebacker for the Jacksonville Jaguars, member of the 1998 Dougherty High School Trojans football team
 Montavious Stanley - former NFL defensive tackle for the Dallas Cowboys, Jacksonville Jaguars, and the Atlanta Falcons

References

External links
 Dougherty High School
 http://www.docoschools.org
 http://www.walb.com/global/story.asp?s=7134592&ClientType=Printable
 http://www.walb.com/Global/story.asp?S=7186200&nav=5kZQ

Public high schools in Georgia (U.S. state)
Educational institutions established in 1963
Charter schools in Georgia (U.S. state)
1963 establishments in Georgia (U.S. state)
Schools in Dougherty County, Georgia
Buildings and structures in Albany, Georgia